The Hainan Daily or Hainan Ribao is a Chinese language daily newspaper published in Hainan Province , People's Republic of China. Originally the organ of the Hainan Provincial Committee of the Chinese Communist Party (中共海南省委机关报), it was established on May 7, 1950,  formerly known as New Hainan Post (新海南报),  which was renamed to its current name in 1958.

In January 1991, Hainan Daily launched the Hainan Daily Overseas Edition (海南日报海外版),  which is 
based on Hainan Special Administrative Region, facing overseas, focusing on Southeast Asia, introducing the policies of Hainan Special Economic Zone (海南经济特区) and the investment environment and other information.

Following reform and opening up, in July 2004, Hainan Daily was privatised and became part of the Hainan Daily Press Group (海南日报报业集团). This group also operates the online news service hinews.cn in simplified Chinese, which in 2009 won a national prize for innovative website development.

See also

 Nanguo Metropolis Daily, Hainan's other major daily newspaper

References

External links
 Current official website of Hainan Daily. hnrb.hinews.cn
 Current official website of Hainan Daily. hndaily.cn
 Original official website of Hainan Daily. www.hndaily.com
 Original official website of Hainan Daily. www.hndaily.com.cn

Daily newspapers published in China
Mass media in Haikou
Publications established in 1950
Organizations based in Haikou
1950 establishments in China
Chinese Communist Party newspapers